Denise Elizabeth Goddard (20 April 1945 – March 2023) was a British artistic gymnast who competed at the 1964 Olympics.

Goddard died in March 2023, at the age of 77.

References

1945 births
2023 deaths
Sportspeople from Cardiff
Welsh female artistic gymnasts 
Gymnasts at the 1964 Summer Olympics
Olympic gymnasts of Great Britain